Kong Fei (November 1911 – January 23, 1993) was the Chairman of the Inner Mongolia Autonomous Region in China from 1978 to 1982.

1911 births
1993 deaths
Members of the 7th Chinese People's Political Consultative Conference
Members of the 6th Chinese People's Political Consultative Conference
People's Republic of China politicians from Inner Mongolia
People from Tongliao
Chinese people of Mongolian descent
People's Liberation Army generals from Inner Mongolia
Political office-holders in Inner Mongolia
Chinese Communist Party politicians from Inner Mongolia